Miss Spain 2022 may refer to these events:
Miss Universe Spain 2022, Miss Spain 2022 for Miss Universe 2022
Miss World Spain 2022, Miss Spain 2022 for Miss World 2022

Disambiguation pages